Multiple-effect humidification (MEH) is a method used for thermal desalination of sea water. It uses multiple evaporation–condensation cycles at separate temperature levels to minimize the total energy consumption of solar humidification processes.

References 

Drinking water
Water desalination

de:Meerwasserentsalzung
es:Desalación
eo:Sensaligo
fr:Dessalement
he:התפלת מי ים
nl:Ontziltingsinstallatie
ja:海水淡水化
oc:Dessalinizacion